Roger Oakley  (born 21 August 1943) is a New Zealand actor and theatre director noted for his performances in television serials, mini-series, feature and television films. He is also active as a theatre performer, director and voice-over. Oakley has been a professional working actor for over 55 years. He is perhaps best known for his role as the original character of foster and later adoptive father Tom Fletcher between 1988 and 1990, with a brief guest role in 2008 on the Seven Network's soap opera Home and Away. His other notable roles include The Sullivans television series and film version as Major. Barrington and Something in the Air, as a controversial politician Doug Rutherford.

Oakley appeared in feature film roles including in 1977 in his native New Zealand in the movie Sleeping Dogs starring Sam Neill, and in Australia in Sara Dane, Women of the Sun, Travelling North and My Year Without Sex but has also appeared in numerous telemovies and mini-series including the 12-part serial The Damnation of Harvey McHugh.

Early life
Oakley was born in Auckland, North Island, New Zealand on 21 August 1943 and had a regular suburban upbringing. After leaving Auckland Grammar School, he studied languages in New Zealand, before he moved to England and appearing on the stage. He emigrated to Australia in 1978, carving out a successful screen career, although he has continued to appear in stage roles, a genre he has been a regular performer since the late 1960s.

Career

Oakley joined the cast of the high rating period drama soap The Sullivans as Major Barrington. He also appeared in The John Sullivan Story, a spin-off from The Sullivans. He has appeared in numerous mini-series and television movies.

He is best known as an original cast member of Home and Away, playing foster father Tom Fletcher from 1988 to 1990, opposite co-star Vanessa Downing who originated the part of wife Pippa Fletcher. He made briefly a guest appearance in 2008. His other role was as Doug Rutherford in Something in the Air in 2000.

Other TV credits include:  Cop Shop, Prisoner, A Country Practice, The Flying Doctors, Good Guys Bad Guys, Blue Heelers, The Young Doctors and Neighbours. , he remains active in the industry. He featured in the stage productions of My Fair Lady, The NightWatchman, Circle Mirror Transformation by Annie Baker, and The Golden Dragon by contemporary German playwright Roland Schimmelpfennig. He also appeared in the television series Underbelly and Winners and Losers.

Film roles include Sara Dane, Travelling North, The Far Country and The Last of the Ryan's.

Filmography

References

External links 
 

1943 births
20th-century New Zealand male actors
21st-century New Zealand male actors
Actors from Auckland
Living people
Male actors from Sydney
New Zealand emigrants to Australia
New Zealand expatriates in England
New Zealand film directors
New Zealand male film actors
New Zealand male television actors
New Zealand male voice actors
People educated at Auckland Grammar School
People from Auckland